Bonne Gauguin (born Ingeborg Kathrine Winther-Hjelm Jelstrup, November 28, 1910 –  July 12, 1989) was a Norwegian actress and dance instructor.

Gauguin trained as a dance teacher in Germany. In the 1930s she moved to Trondheim and made her debut at the Trøndelag Theater. In 1941 she married the visual artist Paul René Gauguin, who was a set designer at the Unge Trøndelag Theater from 1939 to 1945. In 1946 they moved to Oslo, where she got a job at the Studio Theater. The couple divorced before 1950. When the Studio Theater closed down, she started working at the National Traveling Theater, and she also worked at the People's Theater and to a lesser extent at the Norwegian Theater, NRK's Radio Theater and Television Theater, and in Norwegian films. Among her last theatrical appearances was as the teacher in Grease under the direction of Stein Winge in 1984.

Gauguin was the daughter of the architect Thomas Krenkel Jelstrup (1863–1917) and Emilie Constanse "Milly" (née Winter-Hjelm) (1876–1955).

Filmography

 1952: Det kunne vært deg as Mrs. Westberg
 1953: Skøytekongen
 1958: Ut av mørket
 1959: Jakten
 1960: Ungen as Gurina Neger (NRK Television Theater)
 1961: Bussen 
 1963: Om Tilla
 1966: Reisen til havet as Johanne
 1969: Brent jord as the grandmother
 1970: Balladen om mestertyven Ole Høiland as Mrs. Konsmo
 1970: Love Is War as the grandmother
 1970: Operasjon V for vanvidd as Mrs. Philipson
 1970: Selma Brøter (NRK Television Theater)
 1971: Rødblått paradis 
 1973: Brannen as a woman
 1973: Kanarifuglen
 1974: Fleksnes Fataliteter: Biovita Helsesenter as a patient at a health clinic (TV series)
 1977: Åpenbaringen (film) as the mother
 1977: Helmer & Sigurdson: Solospill as Molly Smith  (TV miniseries)
 1988: Fleksnes Fataliteter: Her har jeg mitt liv as a patient at a health clinic (TV series)

References

External links
 
 Bonne Gauguin at Filmfront
 Bonne Gauguin at the National Theater

1910 births
1989 deaths
20th-century Norwegian actresses
Actresses from Oslo
Norwegian female dancers